Sarmazenil (Ro15-3505) is a drug from the benzodiazepine family. It acts as a partial inverse agonist of benzodiazepine receptors, meaning that it causes the opposite effects to most benzodiazepine drugs, and instead acts as an anxiogenic and convulsant. It is used in veterinary medicine to reverse the effects of benzodiazepine sedative drugs in order to rapidly re-awaken anesthetized animals.

See also 
 GABAA receptor negative allosteric modulator
 GABAA receptor § Ligands

References 

Anxiogenics
Carboxylate esters
Chloroarenes
Convulsants
Ethyl esters
GABAA receptor negative allosteric modulators
Imidazobenzodiazepines
Lactams